Sustainable Development Goal 6 (SDG 6 or Global Goal 6) is about "clean water and sanitation for all". It is one of 17 Sustainable Development Goals established by the United Nations General Assembly in 2015, the official wording is: "Ensure availability and sustainable management of water and sanitation for all." The goal has eight targets to be achieved by 2030. Progress toward the targets will be measured by using eleven indicators.

The six outcome targets include: Safe and affordable drinking water; end open defecation and provide access to sanitation, and hygiene, improve water quality, wastewater treatment and safe reuse, increase water-use efficiency and ensure freshwater supplies, implement IWRM, protect and restore water-related ecosystems. The two means of implementation targets are to expand water and sanitation support to developing countries, and to support local engagement in water and sanitation management.

The Joint Monitoring Programme (JMP) of WHO and UNICEF reported in 2017 that 4.5 billion people currently do not have safely managed sanitation. Also in 2017, only 71 per cent of the global population used safely managed drinking water, and 2.2 billion persons were still without safely managed drinking water. 

Official development assistance (ODA) disbursements to the water sector increased to $9 billion in 2018. 

SDG 6 is closely linked with other Sustainable Development Goals (SDGs). For example, progress in SDG 6 will improve health SDG3 and improve school attendance, both of which contribute to alleviating poverty.

Background 

The United Nations (UN) has determined that access to clean water and sanitation facilities is a basic human right. However few countries have included a human right to water in enforceable legislation. 

Safe drinking water and hygienic toilets protect people from disease and enable societies to be more productive economically. 

A review of SDG progress by the UN in 2020 found that "increasing donor commitments to the water sector will remain crucial to make progress towards Goal 6".

Targets, indicators and progress

SDG 6 has eight targets. Six of them are to be achieved by the year 2030, one by the year 2020, and one has no target year. Each of the targets also has one or two indicators which will be used to measure progress. In total there are 11 indicators to monitor progress for SDG6. The main data sources for the SDG 6 targets and indicators come from the Integrated Monitoring Initiative for SDG 6 coordinated by UN-Water. 

The six "outcome-oriented targets" include: Safe and affordable drinking water; end open defecation and provide access to sanitation, and hygiene, improve water quality, wastewater treatment and safe reuse, increase water-use efficiency and ensure freshwater supplies, implement IWRM, protect and restore water-related ecosystems. The two "means of achieving" targets are to expand water and sanitation support to developing countries, and to support local engagement in water and sanitation management.

The first three targets relate to drinking water supply, sanitation services, and wastewater treatment and reuse.

An SDG 6 Baseline Report in 2018 found that "less than 50 percent of countries have comparable baseline estimates for most SDG 6 global indicators".

Target 6.1: Safe and affordable drinking water 
The full title of Target 6.1 is: "By 2030, achieve universal and equitable access to safe and affordable drinking water for all".

This target has one indicator: Indicator 6.1.1 is the "Proportion of population using safely managed drinking water services".

The definition of "safely managed drinking water service" is: "Drinking water from an improved water source that is located on premises, available when needed and free from fecal and priority chemical contamination."

Target 6.2: End open defecation and provide access to sanitation and hygiene 
The full title of Target 6.2 is: "By 2030, achieve access to adequate and equitable sanitation and hygiene for all and end open defecation, paying special attention to the needs of women and girls and those in vulnerable situations."

Attending school and work without disruption supports education and employment. Therefore, toilets at school and the workplace are included in the second target ("achieve access to adequate and equitable sanitation and hygiene for all"). 

Equitable sanitation and hygiene solutions address the needs of women and girls and those in vulnerable situations, such as the elderly or people with disabilities.

This target has one indicator: Indicator 6.2.1 is the "Proportion of population using (a) safely managed sanitation services and (b) a hand-washing facility with soap and water".

The definition of "safely managed sanitation" service is: "Use of improved facilities that are not shared with other households and where excreta are safely disposed of in situ or transported and treated offsite." Improved sanitation facilities are those designed to hygienically separate excreta from human contact.

Ending open defecation will require the provision of toilets and sanitation for 2.6 billion people as well as behavior change of the population. To meet SDG targets for sanitation by 2030, nearly "a third of countries will need to accelerate progress to end open defecation, including Brazil, China, Ethiopia, India, Indonesia, Nigeria, and Pakistan". This will require cooperation between governments, civil society and the private sector.

Report from 2019 for Target 6.1 and 6.2 
Targets 6.1 and 6.2 are usually reported on together because they are both part of the WASH sector and have the same custodian agency, the Joint Monitoring Program for Water Supply and Sanitation (JMP).

In June 2019, the JMP released their 138-page report "Progress on household drinking water, sanitation, and hygiene 2000-2017: special focus on inequalities."

Drinking water (Target 6.1) 
The report said that in 2017, 5.3 billion people—representing 71% of the population of the world—used a "safely managed drinking-water service—one that is "located on premises, available when needed, and free from contamination". 

By 2017, 6.8 billion people—representing 90% of the world's population—used "at least a basic service", which included "an improved drinking-water source within a round trip of 30 minutes to collect water". However, in 2017, there were still 785 million people who lacked "even a basic drinking-water service, including 144 million people who [were] dependent on surface water." 

The report said that approximately 2 billion people used a "drinking water source contaminated with feces". The report warned that diseases, including "diarrhoea, cholera, dysentery, typhoid, and polio" are transmitted by contaminated water, which cause about 485, 000 diarrhoeal deaths each year. It cautioned that 50% of the global population will be "living in water-stressed areas" by 2025.  

By 2017, eighty countries provided access to clean water for more than 99% of their population. From 2000 to 2017, the global population that lacked access to clean water decreased from nearly 20% to roughly 10%.

Sanitation and hygiene (Target 6.2) 
As of 2017, 22% of health care facilities in the least developed countries had no water service, with similar numbers lacking sanitation and waste management services.

The statistic in the 2017 baseline estimate by the JMP is that 4.5 billion people currently do not have safely managed sanitation.

Globally, the proportion of the population using safely managed sanitation services increased from 28 percent in 2000 to 45 percent in 2017. Latin America and the Caribbean, sub-Saharan Africa, and East and Southeast Asia recorded the largest increase. In total, there are still 701 million people around the world who still had to practice open defecation in 2017. This number had reduced in 2020 to 673 million persons who practised open defecation.

Target 6.3: Improve water quality, wastewater treatment, and safe reuse 
Target 6.3 is formulated as "By 2030, improve water quality by reducing pollution, eliminating dumping and minimizing release of hazardous chemicals and materials, halving the proportion of untreated wastewater and substantially increasing recycling and safe reuse globally". This is also a sanitation-related target, as wastewater treatment is part of sanitation.

The target has two indicators:

 Indicator 6.3.1: Proportion of domestic and industrial wastewater flows safely treated
 Indicator 6.3.2: Proportion of bodies of water with good ambient water quality

The current status for Indicator 6.3.2 is that: "Preliminary estimates from 79 mostly high- and higher-middle income countries in 2019 suggest that, in about one quarter of the countries, less than half of all household wastewater flows were treated safely."

Preserving natural sources of water is very important to achieve universal access to safe and affordable drinking water.

Target 6.4: Increase water-use efficiency and ensure freshwater supplies 
Target 6.4 is formulated as "By 2030, substantially increase water-use efficiency across all sectors and ensure sustainable withdrawals and supply of freshwater to address water scarcity and substantially reduce the number of people suffering from water scarcity."

This target has two indicators:

 Indicator 6.4.1: Change in water-use efficiency over time
 Indicator 6.4.2: Level of water stress: freshwater withdrawal as a proportion of available freshwater resources

The current situation regarding water stress was summarized as follows: "In 2017, Central and Southern Asia and Northern Africa registered very high water stress – defined as the ratio of freshwater withdrawn to total renewable freshwater resources – of more than 70 percent". This is followed by Western Asia and Eastern Asia, with high water stress of 54 percent and 46 percent, respectively.

Target 6.5: Implement IWRM 
Target 6.5 is formulated as: "By 2030, implement integrated water resources management at all levels, including through transboundary cooperation as appropriate."

The two indicators include:

 Indicator 6.5.1 Degree of integrated water resources management
 Indicator 6.5.2 Proportion of transboundary basin area with an operational arrangement for water cooperation

A review in 2020 stated that: "In 2018, 60 percent of 172 countries reported very low, low and medium-low levels of implementation of integrated water resources management and were unlikely to meet the implementation target by 2030."

Target 6.6: Protect and restore water-related ecosystems 
Target 6.6 is: "By 2020, protect and restore water-related ecosystems, including mountains, forests, wetlands, rivers, aquifers and lakes."

It has one indicator: Indicator 6.6.1 is the "Change in the extent of water-related ecosystems over time".

Target 6.a: Expand water and sanitation support to developing countries 
Target 6.a is: "By 2030, expand international cooperation and capacity-building support to developing countries in water- and sanitation-related activities and programmes, including water harvesting, desalination, water efficiency, wastewater treatment, recycling, and reuse technologies."

It has one indicator: Indicator 6.a.1 is the "Amount of water- and sanitation-related official development assistance that is part of a government-coordinated spending plan".

In April 2020 the UN progress report stated that "ODA disbursements to the water sector increased to $9 billion, or 6 per cent, in 2018, following a decrease in such disbursements in 2017".

Target 6.b: Support local engagement in water and sanitation management 
Target 6.b is: "Support and strengthen the participation of local communities in improving water and sanitation management."

It has one indicator: Indicator 6.b.1 is the "Proportion of local administrative units with established and operational policies and procedures for participation of local communities in water and sanitation management".

Custodian agencies 
Custodian agencies are in charge of reporting on the following indicators:

 Indicator 6.1.1 and 6.2.1: Joint Monitoring Programme for Water Supply and Sanitation (JMP). The JMP is a joint program of UNICEF and WHO and compiles data to monitor the progress of Target 6.1 and Target 6.2.
 Indicator 6.3.1: UN-Habitat and WHO
 Indicator 6.3.2: Global Environment Monitoring System for Freshwater (GEMS/Water), International Centre for Water Resources and Global Change (UNESCO-IHP); Federal Institute of Hydrology, Germany; University College Cork, Ireland
 Indicators 6.4.1 and 6.4.2: FAOSTAT - AQUASTAT
 Indicator 6.5.1: United Nations Environment Programme-DHI Centre
 Indicator 6.5.2: UNECE and UNESCO-IHP
 Indicator 6.6.1: United Nations Environment Programme, World Conservation Monitoring Centre, International Water Management Institute (IWMI)
 Indicators 6.a.1 and 6.b.1: UN-Water Global Analysis and Assessment of Sanitation and Drinking-Water (GLAAS)

Challenges

Climate change 

Climate change makes it harder to achieve SDG 6 Target 1 (universal access to safe drinking water). This is because climate change can increase weather-related shocks, namely droughts, heavy rain and temperature extremes. This, in turn can cause damage to water infrastructure and water scarcity.

Impact of COVID-19 pandemic 
The COVID-19 pandemic could affect the ability of water utilities to meet SDG 6 by increasing losses on revenues that would otherwise be used to make investments.

The COVID-19 pandemic has greatly affected the urban poor living in the slums with little or no access to clean water. The pandemic has shown the importance of sanitation, hygiene and adequate access to clean water to prevent diseases. According to the World Health Organization, handwashing is one of the most effective actions one can take to reduce the spread of pathogens and prevent infections, including the COVID-19 virus.

Monitoring progress 
High-level progress reports for all the SDGs are published in the form of reports by the United Nations Secretary General. Additionally, updates and progress can also be found on the SDG website which is managed by the United Nations.

In many cases, surrogate indicators will have to be used to measure progress (or the lack of it). Thus, implementation of the SDGs implies continuous monitoring and periodic evaluation to check whether the direction and pace of development are right. 

In April 2020, United Nations Secretary-General António Guterres said: “Today, Sustainable Development Goal 6 is badly off track" and it “is hindering progress on the 2030 Agenda, the realization of human rights and the achievement of peace and security around the world".

Links with other SDGs

The SDGs are highly interdependent. Therefore, the provision of clean water and sanitation for all is a precursor to achieving many of the other SDGs. WASH experts have stated that without progress on Goal 6, the other goals and targets cannot be achieved.

For example, sanitation improvements can lead to more jobs (SDG 8) which would also lead to economic growth.  SDG 6 progress improves health (SDG 3) and social justice (SDG 16). Recovering the resources embedded in excreta and wastewater (like nutrients, water, and energy) contributes to achieving SDG 12 (sustainable consumption and production) and SDG 2 (end hunger). Ensuring adequate sanitation and wastewater management along the entire value chain in cities contributes to SDG 11 (sustainable cities and communities) and SDG 1 (no poverty).

Sanitation systems with a resource recovery and reuse focus are getting increased attention. They can contribute to achieving at least fourteen of the SDGs, especially in an urban context.

Organizations
The Sustainable Sanitation Alliance (SuSanA) has made it its mission to help achieve Targets 6.2 and 6.3. Global organizations such as Oxfam, UNICEF, WaterAid and many small NGOs as well as universities, research centers, private enterprises, government-owned entities etc. are all part of SuSanA and are dedicated to achieving SDG 6.

See also 

 Human right to water and sanitation
 Water security

References

External links

Sustainable Development Knowledge Platform
Water Security and Sustainable Development Hub
UN Sustainable Development Knowledge Platform – SDG 6
“Global Goals” Campaign - SDG 6
SDG-Track.org - SDG 6

Sanitation
International sustainable development
United Nations documents
Global policy organizations
Sustainable Development Goals
Sustainable development